Protobehningia is a genus of sand-burrowing mayfly in the family Behningiidae. There are at least two described species in Protobehningia.

Species
These two species belong to the genus Protobehningia:
 Protobehningia asiatica Tshernova & Bajkova, 1960
 Protobehningia merga Peters & Gillies, 1991

References

Further reading

 
 

Mayflies
Articles created by Qbugbot